Longitarsus ganglbaueri is a species of beetle in the subfamily Galerucinae that can be found in Central Europe, Central Italy, Southern England, South Sweden, Mongolia, and Algeria. It can also be found in Dagestan, a Russian province.

References

G
Beetles described in 1912
Beetles of North Africa
Beetles of Asia
Beetles of Europe